Tracey Baker-Simmons (born July 1, 1967 in Chattanooga) is an American producer, best known as one of the pioneers of urban reality television, is a 17-year production veteran and President/ Co Owner of Simmons-Shelley Entertainment formerly B2 Entertainment Studios. She is an instructor at the Goizueta Business School at Emory University. Baker–Simmons is co-founder of B2 Behind the Scenes, a non-profit organization that seeks to educate young minority men and women on the career opportunities available to them in the field of television and film production.

Biography 
Baker-Simmons graduated from the University of Memphis with a degree in Marketing and Finance.

After graduating from college, Baker-Simmons began her career working in the Music and Promotions department for Warner Brothers Music and made her transition into film production, producing regional commercials for LeRoux.

She moved to Westside Stories and began producing for directors Keith Ward and Julie Dash. From 1992 onward, she produced hundreds of music videos and television commercials, working with Hip Hop R&B artists such as Brandy, Immature, Montell Jordan, Arrested Development, and Nas. Her award- winning television commercials ranged from Coca-Cola and Sprite to McDonald's and MCI.

In 1998, Baker-Simmons launched Strange Fruit Films, a multi-faceted production company, with several partners. She served as Executive Producer and oversaw the production of various music video projects for Jeff Byrd. Baker-Simmons produced the 2002 independent feature film The Book of Love, directed by Byrd.

After resigning from Strange Fruit Films, she worked as a freelance producer in television production, with clients such as distributor Pearson Television, ABC and CBS networks.

Baker-Simmons established B2 Entertainment Studios LLC, an Atlanta-based production company in 2003 with her close friend and partner, Wanda Shelley. Most notably, B2 Entertainment Studios, are known for the reality show, Being Bobby Brown starring Bobby Brown Whitney Houston which aired in 2005 on the Bravo network.  She served as a Producer for Tyler Perry's Tyler Perry's House of Payne and for a TBS summer promotional campaign featuring Chrisette Michele.

In 2009, B2 Entertainment Studios was renamed Simmons-Shelley Entertainment.  Baker-Simmons is the Executive Producer with Keith Sweat, of reality series Platinum House featuring Dru Hill and Supervising producer of Welcome to Dreamland starring producers Drumma Boy and Jazze Pha which first aired as specials on Peachtree TV, a Turner Broadcasting System station, and then on BET Networks, Summer '09 and Summer '10 respectively.

Simmons-Shelley Entertainment in partnership with Rain Forest Films, The Coca-Cola Company and MTV debuted their docu-series for MTV2 Sprite Step-Off in January 2010. Hosted by Chris "Ludacris" Bridges, the series follows six step teams from fraternities and sororities across the country as they compete in the Sprite Step Off.

Baker-Simmons serves as the Head of Development for Jarrett Creative. She served as Executive Producer and Showrunner for Lifetime's The Houstons: On Our Own Season 1 which aired October 24, 2012 starring the family of Whitney Houston.

She is married with one son.

Awards and nominations

Filmography

Producer

Sources 
 https://archive.today/20121212160717/http://www.knowledge.emory.edu/article.cfm?articleid=1131
 http://www.newlifeortho.com/1085.html
 http://www.prlog.org/10183610-simmonsshelley-entertainment-and-rb-legend-keith-sweat-present-platinum-house-for-peachtree-tv.html
 http://www.mtv.com/shows/sprite_step_off/series.jhtml

Living people
1967 births
People from Chattanooga, Tennessee
University of Memphis alumni
Film producers from Tennessee
Television producers from Tennessee